Peter Murdoch (16 October 1865 – 24 October 1948) was an Australian politician. Born in Hobart, he was a member of the Tasmanian House of Assembly from 1922, when he was elected as a Nationalist member for Franklin. He left the Nationalist Party to become an independent in 1925 and was re-elected at that year's election, but he was defeated at the 1928 state election. After unsuccessfully contesting the 1929 by-election for the federal seat of Franklin, he retired from politics. Murdoch died in Hobart in 1948.

References

1865 births
1948 deaths
Members of the Tasmanian House of Assembly
Nationalist Party of Australia members of the Parliament of Tasmania
Independent members of the Parliament of Tasmania
Politicians from Hobart